Chaim Gingold (born January 15, 1980 in Haifa, Israel) is noted for his work with the computer game Spore, where he designed the game's creators, including the Spore Creature Creator. Chaim was also a key member of Spore's design and prototyping team. He has presented at the Game Developers Conference and is an active participant in the academic game studies community.

Gingold grew up in Morgantown, West Virginia. He attended West Virginia University, where he studied computer science, English, and art. After college, Gingold headed to the Georgia Institute of Technology where he joined the Information Design and Technology Masters program. His dissertation was entitled "Miniature Gardens & Magic Crayons: Games, Spaces, & Worlds" and was supervised by noted scholar Janet Murray. Gingold lives in Berkeley, California, USA and is a Ph.D student in Computational Media at UC Santa Cruz.

In January 2015, Gingold released Earth Primer, an interactive science book that simulates processes of the Earth.

References

External links

 Chaim Gingold's web page

American video game designers
Jewish video game developers
Israeli computer programmers
Israeli emigrants to the United States
Israeli Jews
Georgia Tech alumni
West Virginia University alumni
Morgantown High School alumni
People from Haifa
1980 births
Living people